Heterodon kennerlyi, also known as the Mexican hognose snake, is a snake of the colubrid family. It is found in southern Texas in the United States and Mexico.

References

Heterodon
Snakes of North America
Reptiles of the United States
Reptiles of Mexico
Taxa named by Robert Kennicott
Reptiles described in 1860